Tim Lane is a U.S corporate executive, entrepreneur, and investor.

Education and early career

Born in Chicago Tim Lane received his B.A. in Accounting from the University of Dayton, and his M.B.A. in marketing and finance from the University of Chicago Booth School of Business. His early professional experience included a general management role at Masonite International Corporation and the position of Assistant to the Chairman at Consolidated Packaging Company.

Career

PepsiCo, Inc., 1981–1996

In 1981 Tim Lane became the Director of Business Planning at the Pepsi-Cola Company where he introduced innovative strategies including the roll-up of Pepsi's franchise bottling network. Lane successfully launched a number of new products,  including Slice (soft drink). The following year Tim became Vice President and CFO of Pepsi-Cola's Food Service Division where his leadership contributed to a four-fold increase in divisional profits while doubling Pepsi's market share. Two years later, as Vice President and CFO of Pepsi's Frito-Lay International, he led an acquisition strategy that took division revenue from $400 million to $3 billion. Between 1987 and 1989 Tim oversaw operations in 150 countries as Vice President and CFO of Pepsi-Cola International and KFC Worldwide. The next stage of his career brought him wide recognition in the business community while he served as President of KFC International Asia and CEO of PepsiCo Restaurants International, Asia, and the Middle East.

At KFC International Asia Tim Lane inherited a loss-making 250 store system generating $250 million in sales. Within 6 years he built a new management team, revitalized KFC's flagging franchise system, initiated substantial development of company-owned markets, including the opening of China  and India, and built a 2500 store system generating $2.5 billion in revenues and more than $200 million in profits. As KFC President he led 22 consecutive quarters of double-digit growth in stores, revenues and profitability. During this period Tim Lane also orchestrated the successful IPO of KFC Japan. This expansion resulted in dominant KFC share positions across Asia and the Middle East, and particularly in China. The China expansion in particular brought Tim media attention and acclaim in the international business community. The business growth platform developed by Tim Lane and his team, especially as it related to KFC's dominance in China, enabled PepsiCo to spin off the restaurant group into what is known today as Yum! Brands.

Holiday Inn Worldwide, Chairman, President and CEO, 1996

In 1996 Tim Lane became Chairman, President and CEO of Holiday Inn Worldwide, one of the world's largest hotel groups comprising 2,300 hotels with system revenues of $8 billion, direct revenues of $2 billion and operating profits of $300 million. He recruited new top management to re-invigorate the organization and create a results-driven culture. Within a year Lane developed award-winning advertising with a newly engaged advertising and marketing firm, launched a proprietary “extended stay” brand, Staybridge Suites, and bought out troubled joint ventures in India and Indonesia.
Lane negotiated several company and industry transformational acquisitions. All of them, however,  were ultimately rejected by London-based Bass PLC, parent company of Holiday Inn. A year later Lane sought an early exit when it became apparent to Lane that Bass PLC "lacked the corporate courage to implement real change."

Nation Building, Afghanistan, 2002–2007

In 2002 Tim Lane co-founded The Afghanistan Reconstruction Company LLC (ARC), built the new Embassy of the United States, Kabul complex, and completed many vital infrastructure projects. and over the following 5 years rebuilt the Kabul-Kandahar Highway for USAID, built the new Embassy of the United States, Kabul complex, and completed many vital infrastructure projects.

Tim established the first privately owned commercial bank in Afghanistan, the Afghanistan International Bank (AIB)  in partnership with Asian Development Bank and ING Group. He also constructed, owned and operated a successful soft drink bottling plant in Kabul.

Everest Advisors, corporate and charity work, 1997–present 

Tim Lane is the Managing Director of Everest Advisors, Inc., a venture capital and advisory firm he founded in 1997. Based in Hong Kong, Everest Advisors  consulted ChinaVest and JP Morgan on Asia/China portfolio companies. EA was an early investor in Bacterin International (BONE - IPO in 2010), a biologics processing and manufacturing company with proprietary patented technology servicing the orthopedic surgical market, and in Navigate Inc., a cloud based enterprise solution provider serving the financial services industry and competing against firms such as Salesforce.com and SAP.

Tim Lane served as  CEO and Vice-Chairman of the Board at  Food Automation Service Techniques, Inc (dba Kitchen Brains) which  designs, manufactures, and sells sophisticated process controls and cloud-based SaaS solutions for the food services industry.
Tim has also served as the Chairman of the Board of True Drinks, Inc, a healthy children's  beverage business with ties to The Walt Disney Company.

In April 2016 Tim Lane was elected to the board of directors American Humane Association.

References

External links 
Official website of the Afghanistan International Bank
Official website of the Afghanistan Reconstruction Company LLC
Afghanistan Beverage Industries Limited

American chief financial officers
American chief executives of food industry companies
American chief operating officers
KFC people
Living people
University of Dayton alumni
University of Chicago Booth School of Business alumni
Year of birth missing (living people)